is a stable of sumo wrestlers, formerly part of the Tokitsukaze ichimon or group of stables. It was established in its current form in February 2004 by former sekiwake Terao Tsunefumi, who branched off from the Izutsu stable. He did not take any established wrestlers with him, recruiting all the wrestlers himself instead. In December 2017 Shikoroyama-oyakata left the Tokitsukaze group along with Tatsutagawa-oyakata (former komusubi Hōmashō) and Minato-oyakata (former maegashira Minatofuji), announcing that he would not join any other ichimon but would support Takanohana in the January 2018 elections to the board of the Japan Sumo Association. In September 2018 the stable joined the Nishonoseki group. As of January 2023, the stable had 16 wrestlers.

Hamatensei (real name Issei Amakusa), a junior wrestler who competed for the stable from 2011 to 2019, became a civil servant after completing a correspondence course as part of an arrangement between the Japan Sumo Association and NHK Gakuen senior high school.

Ring name conventions
Since the establishment of the stable, some wrestlers at this stable have taken ring names or shikona that begin with the characters 寺尾 (read: terao), in deference to their coach and the stable's owner, the former Terao. Examples include Teraoshō, Teraoumi and Teraowaka.

Owner
2004–present: 20th Shikoroyama (iin, former sekiwake Terao)

Notable active wrestlers

Abi (best rank sekiwake)
 (best rank jūryō)

Former wrestlers
Hōmashō (best rank komusubi)
Seirō (best rank maegashira)
 (best rank jūryō)

Coach
Tatsutagawa Noriyuki (iin, former komusubi Hōmashō)

Referee
Kimura Shunta (Jonidan gyōji, real name Shunta Utsugi)

Usher
Setsuo (Makushita yobidashi, real name Satoru Kumazaki)

Hairdresser
Tokofumi (3rd class tokoyama)

Location and access
Tokyo, Kōtō Ward, Kiyosumi 3-6-2
3 minute walk from Kiyosumi-shirakawa Station on the Ōedo Line and Hanzōmon Line

See also
List of sumo stables
List of active sumo wrestlers
List of past sumo wrestlers
Glossary of sumo terms

References

External links
Official site 
Japan Sumo Association profile
Shikoroyama blog

Active sumo stables